Trypanosoma  phedinae is a species of excavates with flagellae  first isolated from the Mascarene martin, Phedina borbonica, in Mauritius.

References

Species described in 1977
Trypanosomatida
Parasites of birds